Stanley Richard Chesler (born June 15, 1947) is a senior United States district judge of the United States District Court for the District of New Jersey.

Education and career
Chesler graduated from Harpur College, now Binghamton University, in 1968, with a Bachelor of Arts degree, and St. John's University School of Law in 1974 with a Juris Doctor.  He was an assistant district attorney in The Bronx from 1974–80, a federal prosecutor at the U.S. Attorney's Office for the District of New Jersey from 1980–87, and a United States Magistrate Judge in New Jersey from 1987 until his appointment as a District Judge.

District court service

He was nominated by President George W. Bush on January 23, 2002, to a seat vacated by Judge Anne Elise Thompson and was confirmed by the United States Senate on November 14, 2002. Chesler received his commission on December 4, 2002 and was sworn in thereafter. He assumed senior status on June 15, 2015.

Notable case

The class action lawsuit settlement SULLIVAN, vs. DB Investments is being administered in Chesler's court, and as of April 8, 2013, payout of the $107 million settlement to some 500,000 claimants is pending Chesler's signature.

References

Sources

Living people
1947 births
Assistant United States Attorneys
Harpur College alumni
Judges of the United States District Court for the District of New Jersey
People from Brooklyn
St. John's University School of Law alumni
United States district court judges appointed by George W. Bush
21st-century American judges
United States magistrate judges